Wendell Vernon Clausen (April 2, 1923 - October 12, 2006) was an American classicist.

References

External links
Clausen, Wendell 1923-2006 [WorldCat Identities]

American classical scholars
1923 births
2006 deaths